The Cuba women's national football team is the national women's football team of Cuba and is overseen by the Asociación de Fútbol de Cuba. In 2018, Cuba qualified for its first ever CONCACAF Women's Championship after finishing third in Caribbean Zone Qualifying.

Results and fixtures

The following is a list of match results in the last 12 months, as well as any future matches that have been scheduled.

Legend

2022

Players

Up-to-date caps, goals, and statistics are not publicly available; therefore, caps and goals listed may be incorrect.

Current squad
The following players were called up to play the matches against Honduras on 8 April 2022.

Coach: Edelsio Griego

Recent call ups

Competitive record

FIFA Women's World Cup

*Draws include knockout matches decided on penalty kicks.

Olympic Games

*Draws include knockout matches decided on penalty kicks.

CONCACAF W Championship

*Draws include knockout matches decided on penalty kicks.

Pan American Games

*Draws include knockout matches decided on penalty kicks.

Central American and Caribbean Games

*Draws include knockout matches decided on penalty kicks.

CFU Women's Caribbean Cup

*Draws include knockout matches decided on penalty kicks.

References

External links
FIFA Profile